QuickCode (formerly ScraperWiki) was a web-based platform for collaboratively building programs to extract and analyze public (online) data, in a wiki-like fashion. "Scraper" refers to screen scrapers, programs that extract data from websites. "Wiki" means that any user with programming experience can create or edit such programs for extracting new data, or for analyzing existing datasets. The main use of the website is providing a place for programmers and journalists to collaborate on analyzing public data.

The service was renamed circa 2016, as "it isn't a wiki or just for scraping any more". At the same time, the eponymous parent company was renamed 'The Sensible Code Company'.

Scrapers
Scrapers are created using a browser based IDE or by connecting via SSH to a server running Linux. They can be programmed using a variety of programming languages, including Perl, Python, Ruby, JavaScript and R.

History
ScraperWiki was founded in 2009 by Julian Todd and Aidan McGuire. It was initially funded by 4iP, the venture capital arm of TV station Channel 4. Since then, it has attracted an additional £1 Million round of funding from Enterprise Ventures.

Aidan McGuire is the chief executive officer of The Sensible Code Company

See also
 Data driven journalism
 Web scraping

References

External links
 
 github repository of custard

Collaborative projects
Wikis
Social information processing
Web analytics
Mashup (web application hybrid)
Web scraping
Software using the GNU AGPL license